David Veesler is a French biochemist and an assistant professor in the Department of Biochemistry at the University of Washington, where his group focuses on the study the structural biology of infectious diseases. His team recently helped determine the structure of the SARS-CoV-2 spike glycoprotein  using Cryo-EM techniques, and it is currently trying to identify neutralizing antibodies for SARS-CoV-2 that could be used as a preventative treatment against COVID-19 or as a post-exposure therapy using X-ray crystallography. Veesler is Howard Hughes Medical Investigators.

Education 
David Veesler earned his Ph.D. from Aix-Marseille University in France in 2010. He was a visiting researcher at the University of Zurich in Switzerland during his PhD, and joined the Scripps Research Institute in La Jolla, California as postdoctoral fellow from 2011 to 2014 before joining the University of Washington.

Awards and honors  
 2013 Microscopy Society of America Presidential Scholar Award
 2012 The Scripps Research Institute Fall Research Symposium Award
 2011 Marie-Curie International Outgoing Postdoctoral Fellowship
 2011 French Crystallographic Association PhD award
 2009 Wyatt Technology award
 2006 French Ministry of Higher Education and Research PhD fellowship

References 

French biochemists
Year of birth missing (living people)
Living people
Place of birth missing (living people)
Aix-Marseille University alumni
University of Washington faculty
Howard Hughes Medical Investigators